Rushern "Rush" Baker IV (born September 10, 1987) is an American painter and past candidate for the Maryland House of Delegates to represent District 22 in Prince George's County.

Early life and education
Baker was born in Washington, DC on September 10, 1987 to Prince George's County Executive Rushern L. Baker, III and the former Christa Beverly. When he was four years old, his family moved to Cheverly, Maryland. Baker attended Prince George's County public schools and graduated from Suitland High School in Forestville, Maryland. He earned a Bachelor of Fine Arts degree from Cooper Union in 2009 and a Master of Fine Arts with a concentration in painting/printmaking from Yale University in 2012, where he was awarded the Elizabeth Canfield Hicks Award for outstanding achievement in drawing or painting from nature.

Career
After graduating from Yale, Baker moved back to Prince George's County. He is a self-employed artist whose work is greatly influenced by politics, and have been described as being "heavily influenced by author Octavia Butler’s Afrofuturist novels, most notably Parable of the Sower." In a 2013 interview, he said “I want my paintings to generate a discourse around policy, especially foreign policy." Baker's work has appeared in numerous exhibitions in Maryland, DC, New York, Connecticut, California, North Carolina, Dubai, and Japan, and is currently a lecturer at the University of Maryland on drawing and two-dimensional design. Baker previously coordinated a publicly funded mobile arts program for youth. He is a former artist-in-residence at 39th Street Gallery, a part of The Gateway Arts Center in Brentwood, Maryland.

In discussing his most recent exhibition in 2019 at Washington, DC's Hemphill Fine Arts, the reviewing art critic asserted that "Baker’s energetic and frenetic abstractions invoke a range of concerns, from the perils of living while black and the widening income gap to the proliferation of alternative facts and weaponized technology."

In June 2022, Baker took over as campaign manager of his father's gubernatorial campaign after his previous campaign manager, Andrew Mallinoff, stepped down. His father suspended his campaign later that month. In January 2023, Baker filed to run for the nomination to fill the vacancy left by Alonzo T. Washington in District 22 of the Maryland House of Delegates. On February 8, after Washington endorsed Baker's opponent Ashanti Martinez, Baker announced that he would no longer run for the vacancy.

References

1987 births
Living people
American male painters
21st-century American painters
American political candidates
African-American people in Maryland politics
Yale School of Art alumni
Cooper Union alumni
Painters from Washington, D.C.
People from Cheverly, Maryland
Painters from Maryland
African-American painters
University of Maryland, College Park faculty